Shanghai University of International Business and Economics (SUIBE), known as Shanghai Institute of Foreign Trade before 2013, is a public university in Shanghai, China. Founded in 1960, SUIBE is an institution of higher learning formerly subordinate to the Ministry of Foreign Trade and Economic Cooperation.  Since 1994 it is under the administration of the Shanghai Municipal Government.

As of 2021, Shanghai University of International Business and Economics ranked 2nd in Shanghai after Shanghai University of Finance and Economics and 11th nationwide among universities specialized in finance, business, and economics in the recent edition of the recognized Best Chinese Universities Ranking.

Presentation 
SUIBE is among the first institutions across the world selected for hosting a WTO Chair. With a view to adding to Shanghai's and China's strengths in international trade and economy, SUIBE is actively engaged in high-level researches in fields related to international trade on the platforms provided by such research institutes as the Shanghai Research Centre for Strategies on International Trade and the Shanghai Research Institute for Development Strategies, which is designated as a Key Research Base for Studies in Humanities and Social Sciences conducted by Institutions of Higher Learning in Shanghai and Shanghai Innovation Research Base for Social Sciences. Spearheading high-level studies in international trade, some SUIBE professors are recognized as chief experts at the Shanghai Innovation Research Base for Social Sciences and the Studio of the Shanghai Research Institute for Development Strategies.

See also 
 List of universities and colleges in Shanghai

References

External links
  Official website

Business schools in China
Universities and colleges in Shanghai
Educational institutions established in 1960
1960 establishments in China
Foreign trade of China